

Regular-Season Standings

División de Honor de Béisbol